Both Sunni Muslims and Shia Muslims agree on the three holiest sites in Islam being, respectively, the Masjid al-Haram (including the Kaaba), in Mecca; the Al-Masjid an-Nabawi, in Medina; and the Al Aqsa Mosque compound, in Jerusalem.

Shia Muslims consider sites associated with Muhammad, his family members (Ahl al-Bayt), Shia Imams and their family members to be holy. After the four holy cities of Islam (Mecca, Medina, Jerusalem and Damascus, which houses the Umayyad Mosque, often considered the fourth holiest site in Islam), some of the most revered sites by Shias include Najaf and Karbala, in Iraq, and Qom, in Iran.

Holy sites accepted by all Muslims

Kaaba
Kaaba (Arabic: The Cube) is the most sacred site in Islam. It is surrounded by Masjid-al-Haram. During the Hajj period, the mosque is unable to contain the multitude of pilgrims, who pray on the outlining streets. More than 2 million worshippers gather to pray during Eid prayers.

According to the teachings of Islam, God in the Quran used the word mosque when referring to the sites established by Ibrahim (Abraham) and his progeny as houses of worship to God centuries before the revelation of the Quran. The first of these spots is Masjid al-Haram in Mecca and the second is Al-Aqsa Mosque in Jerusalem. Before Mecca and Jerusalem came under Muslim control between 630 AD and 638 AD, the site of the Kaaba, which was established by Abraham and Ishmael, was used by non-Muslim Arabs who worshipped multiple gods.

Al-Masjid an-Nabawi
Al-Masjid an-Nabawi ("Mosque of the Prophet"), located in Medina, Saudi Arabia is the second holiest site in Islam.

The edifice was originally Muhammad's house; he settled there after his Hijra (emigration) to Medina, and later built a mosque on the grounds. He himself shared in the heavy work of construction. The original mosque was an open-air building, with no gender separation. The mosque also served as a community center, a court, and a religious school. There was a raised platform for the people who taught the Quran. The basic plan of the building has been adopted in the building of other mosques throughout the world.

The original mosque was built by Muhammad and subsequent Islamic rulers greatly expanded and decorated the mosque. The most important feature of the site is the Green Dome over the center of the mosque, where the tomb of Muhammad is located. Constructed in 1817 CE and painted green in 1839, it is known as the Dome of the Prophet.

Al-Aqsa Mosque compound

Al-Aqsa Mosque Compound / Haram Ash-Sharif ("the Farthest Mosque" / "the Noble Sanctuary") is a mosque in the Old City of Jerusalem, and is the third holiest site in Islam. It includes the Dome of the Rock and a silver domed prayer hall, also referred to in English as Aqsa Mosque. In Judaism, the location is known as the Temple Mount, the holiest site in Judaism, the place where the Temple is generally accepted to have stood.

The Al-Aqsa Mosque Compound is sacred because it was the first of the two Qiblas. Islamic tradition holds that Muhammad led prayers towards this site until the seventeenth month after the emigration, when God directed him to turn towards the Kaaba.

Muslims believe that Muhammad was transported by the Buraq from the Sacred Mosque in Mecca to al-Aqsa during the Night Journey. The mosque is also believed by many to be the area from where Muhammad is said to have ascended to heaven. According to some narrations, a single prayer performed at this mosque is the same as having performed 500 prayers elsewhere.

Umayyad Mosque 
Umayyad Mosque in Damascus is considered by Muslims to be the fourth holiest site in Islam. One of the four authorized copies of the Quran was kept here, and the head of Yahya ibn Zakariyya is believed to be in the shrine. In the mosque, there is a shrine of Husayn ibn Ali and the Ahl al-Bayt, made to walk here after the Battle of Karbala. 

The Minaret of Isa in the Umayyad Mosque is dedicated to Isa (Jesus), and it is believed that he will return to the world at the minaret during the time of a Fajr prayer and it is believed that he will pray at the mosque with the Islamic leader of that time Mahdi. It is believed that prayers in the mosque are considered to be equal to those offered in Jerusalem.

Holy sites accepted by Shia Muslims

Imam Ali Shrine

Of the sites accepted by Shia Muslims, the Imam Ali Shrine in Najaf is considered the holiest. Shia Muslims believe that it contains the tomb of Ali. He was the cousin and son-in-law of Muhammad. Ali is considered by Shia tradition to be the first legitimate caliph and the first Imam due to the proclamation given by Muhammad. The site is visited annually by at least 8 million pilgrims on average, which is estimated to increase to 20 million in years to come. Adam and Noah are also buried within this mosque according to Shia Islam.

Many Shia believe that Ali did not want his grave to be desecrated by his enemies and consequently asked his friends and family to bury him secretly. This secret gravesite is supposed to have been revealed later during the Abbasid Caliphate by Ja'far al-Sadiq who is believed by Shia Muslims, the sixth Shia Imam. Most Shias accept that Ali is buried in the Imam Ali Mosque which is now the city of Najaf.

It has also been narrated from Ja'far al-Sadiq, the Shia's sixth Imam, that the Imam Ali Mosque is the third of five holy places: Mecca, Medina, Imam Ali Mosque in Najaf, Imam Husayn Shrine in Karbala, and the shrine of Fatima Masumeh in Qom.

Imam Husayn Shrine

Imam Husayn Shrine in Karbala is the second holiest site especially for Shia Muslims. It contains the tomb of the Husayn, the third Shia Imam. It also contains the tombs of Ali al-Akbar ibn Husayn, Ali al-Asghar ibn Husayn, sons of Husayn; Ibrahim al-Mujab, grandson of Musa al-Kadhim and the martyrs of Karbala.

The mosque stands on the site of the grave of Husayn ibn Ali, where he was martyred during the Battle of Karbala in 680. Up to a million pilgrims visit the city to observe the anniversary of Husayn ibn Ali's death. There are many Shia traditions which narrate the status of Karbala:

Fatima Masumeh Shrine

The Fatima Masumeh Shrine in Qom, Iran contains the tomb of Fatimah bint Musa, sister of the eighth Shia Imam, Ali al-Ridha. Located in Qom, Iran, it has been considered the Fatima Masumeh Shrine to be the third holiest shrine in Shia Islam. The shrine has attracted to itself dozens of seminaries and religious schools.

Jamkaran Mosque

The Jamkaran Mosque in Qom, Iran is one of the primary significant mosques in Jamkaran. Hassan ibn Muthlih Jamkarani is reported to have met the Shia's 12th Imam Muhammad al-Mahdi. In the rear of the mosque, there is a "well of requests". Pilgrims tie small strings in a knot around the grids covering the holy well, which they hope will be received by the Imam Mahdi.

Al-Sahlah Mosque

The Al-Sahlah Mosque in Kufa, Iraq is said to be the future home of the Twelfth Shia Imam, Muhammad al-Mahdi.

Sayyidah Zaynab Mosque
 
The Sayyidah Zaynab Mosque in Damascus, Syria contains the tomb of Zaynab bint Ali, the daughter of Ali and Fatimah, and the granddaughter of Muhammad.

Al-Abbas Shrine

The Al-Abbas Shrine is located directly across from the Imam Husayn Shrine, and contains the tomb of Abbas ibn Ali, son of Ali and brother of Husayn.

Millions of pilgrims visit the shrine and pay homage to it every year. The real grave of Abbas is beneath the masoulem, and is present in the shrine. Emperors and kings of various dynasties have offered valuable gifts and gems to the shrine of Abbas. It was designed by Persian and Central Asian architects. The central pear shaped dome is an ornately decorated structure. On its sides stand two tall minarets. The tomb is covered with pure gold and surrounded by a trellis of silver. Iranian carpets are rolled out on the floors.

Sayyidah Ruqayya Mosque

The Sayyidah Ruqayya Mosque in Damascus, Syria contains the tomb of Sukayna bint Husayn, the youngest daughter of Husayn ibn Ali, often referred to by her title: "Ruqayya".

Al-Kadhimiya Mosque

The Al-Kadhimiya Mosque in Baghdad, Iraq contains the tombs of Musa al-Kadhim, seventh Shia Imam and Muhammad al-Jawad, ninth Shia Imam. Some consider the mosque the third holiest in Shia Islam.

Imam Reza Shrine

Imam Reza Shrine in Mashhad, Iran contains the tomb of Ali al-Ridha, the eighth Shia Imam. Ali al-Ridha is believed, by members of the Shia, to have been poisoned there upon the orders of Caliph Al-Ma'mun and the place was subsequently called, Mashhad ar-Ridhā (the place of martyrdom of Ali al-Ridha). By the end of the 9th century a dome was built on the grave and many buildings and bazaars sprang up around it. For years totalling more than a millennium, the mosque was destroyed and reconstructed several times.

Nowadays Imam al-Ridha shrine in Mashhad, Iran, is a complex which contains the mausoleum of Ali al-Ridha, the eighth Shia Imam. Several important theological schools are associated with the shrine of the eighth Imam. As a city of great religious significance, it is also a place of pilgrimage. It is said that the rich go to Mecca but the poor journey to Mashhad. Thus, even as those who complete the pilgrimage to Mecca receive the title of Haji, those who make the pilgrimage to Mashhad–and especially to the Imam Ridha shrine–are known as Mashtee, a term employed also of its inhabitants. It is thought that over 20 million Muslims a year make the pilgrimage to Mashhad. It is generally considered to be the holiest Shia shrine in Iran, and is sometimes ranked as the third holiest Shia shrine in the world.

Al-Askari Shrine

The Al-Askari Shrine in Samarra, Iraq contains the tombs of Ali al-Hadi, tenth Shia Imam and Hasan al-Askari, eleventh Shia Imam. Hakimah Khātūn, sister of Ali al-Hadi and Narjis, mother of Muhammad al-Mahdi are also buried within the mosque. The cellar from which the twelfth or "Hidden" Imam, Muhammad al-Mahdi, disappeared from view is also found within this mosque.

At the time of the Al-Askari bombing in Samarra, it was reported that the mosque was one of Shia Islam's holiest sites, only exceeded by the shrines of Najaf and Karbala, making it the third holiest Shia site.

Mosques associated with companions of Muhammad and the Shia Imams 
 Tomb of Salman the Persian, Hudhayfah ibn al-Yaman, Jabir ibn Abd Allah and Tahir ibn Muhammad al-Baqir in Al-Mada'in, Iraq
 Uwais al-Qarni Mosque in Raqqa, Syria. It contains graves of Uwais al-Qarni and Ammar ibn Yasir.
 Tomb of Maytham al-Tammar in Kufa, Iraq

 Tomb of Kumayl ibn Ziyad in Kufa, Iraq

 Hujr ibn Adi Mosque in Adra' (north of Damascus), Syria
 Shrine of Malik al-Ashtar in Egypt. He was one of the most loyal companions of Ali.
 Tomb of Al-Hurr ibn Yazid Al-Tamimi companion of Imam Husayn, who was martyred in Battle of Karbala.
 Other several tombs and graves of companions in Iraq, Iran, Saudi Arabia, Palestine, Egypt and Yemen
Al-Hannanah Mosque in Kufa, Iraq - contains some of the skin of Husayn ibn Ali which was ripped off of him post-mortem by the aggressors of Battle of Karbala.
 Tombs of Ja'far ibn Abi Talib also known as Ja'far al-Tayyar, cousin of Muhammad and brother of Ali, and Zayd ibn Harithah after their martyrdom during the battle of Battle of Mu'tah, located in Mu'tah in Jordan.
Al-Nuqtah Mosque in Aleppo, Syria - this mosque contains a large stone where the head of Husayn ibn Ali was placed, while on a stop-over along the journey from Karbala to Damascus.
Shrine of Husayn's Head (destroyed in 1950) – this mosque contained the head of Husayn ibn Ali for about two centuries in the middle ages

Tombs of other family members of Muhammad 
 Imamzadeh in Ganja, Azerbaijan - bears the grave of one of the sons of Muhammad al-Baqir.
 Shrine of Muhammad ibn Ali al-Hadi in Balad, Iraq - entombs the remains of Muhammad ibn Ali al-Hadi, son of Ali al-Hadi
 Imamzadeh Saleh in Shemiran, Tehran, Iran - entombs the remains of Saleh, son of Musa al-Kadhim
 Shah Abdol-Azim Shrine in Rey, Iran - entombs the remains of Abdul Azim, descendant of Hasan ibn Ali. The mosque also contains the tombs of a son of Ali ibn al-Husayn and a son of Musa al-Kadhim.

 Shah Cheragh in Shiraz, Iran - entombs the remains of Ahmad and Muhammad, sons of Musa al-Kadhim
 Imamzadeh Seyed Morteza in Kashmar, Iran - entombs another son of Musa al-Kadhim
 Imamzadeh Hamzah, Tabriz in Tabriz, Iran - entombs another son of Musa al-Kadhim
 Imamzadeh Hamzeh, Kashmar  in Kashmar, the tomb of Hamzah al-Hamzah ibn Musa al-Kadhim

 Shrine of Sultan Ali in Mashhad Ardehal, Iran - entombs the remains of Sultan Ali, son of Muhammad al-Baqir
 Shrine of Qutham ibn Abbas in Shah-i-Zinda, Samarkand, Uzbekistan - the cousin of Muhammad
 Various Imamzadeh scattered throughout Iran and Iraq

Holy sites specific to other Shia Muslims (non-Twelvers)

 Shrines of the Isma'ili Imams, Hujjas and Da'i al-Mutlaqs - Imams - see List of Isma'ili imams, Hujjas - Arwa al-Sulayhi, Nasir Khusraw and Da'is - see List of Dai of the Dawoodi Bohra.
 Shrines of the Isma'ili Da'is or Missionary - see List of Isma'ili missionaries.
 Ruins of the Isma'ili castles - see List of Isma'ili castles.

Cemeteries

Al-Baqi'

Al-Baqi' (Jannat al-Baqee) is a cemetery located across from Al-Masjid al-Nabawi in Medina, Saudi Arabia. It is the oldest and first Islamic cemetery. Holy figures of Shia buried here include
 Shia Imams:
Hasan ibn Ali (first grandson of Muhammad)
Ali ibn Husayn Zayn al-Abidin
Muhammad al-Baqir (Twelver/Isma'ili not Zaydi)
Ja'far al-Sadiq (Twelver/Isma'ili)
Isma'il ibn Ja'far (Isma'ili)
 Relatives of Shia figures:
 Fatimah bint Asad - mother of Ali
 Umm al-Banin - mother of Abbas ibn Ali
 Bibi Shahrbānū - mother of Ali ibn Husayn Zayn al-Abidin
 Halimah bint Abi Dhuayb - wet nurse of Muhammad

Jannat al-Mu'alla Cemetery

The Jannat al-Mu'alla cemetery in Mecca, Saudi Arabia contains the graves of many relatives of Muhammad, held in high esteem by the Shia, including:

 Abd Manaf ibn Qusai - great-great-grandfather of Muhammad
 Hashim ibn Abd Manaf - great-grandfather of Muhammad
 Abd al-Muttalib - grandfather of Muhammad
 Abu Talib ibn Abd al-Muttalib - uncle of Muhammad and father of the first Shia Imam, Ali
 Khadija bint Khuwaylid - first wife of Muhammad and mother of Fatimah
 Qasim ibn Muhammad - son of Muhammad who died in his infancy
 Possible grave of Aminah bint Wahb - mother of Muhammad

Bab al-Saghir Cemetery
The Bab al-Saghir cemetery in Damascus, Syria contains the graves of many relatives of Muhammad as well as sites related to the Battle of Karbala. Some of the figures laid to rest here include:

 Umm Kulthum bint Ali - daughter of Ali and Fatimah, granddaughter of Muhammad
 Bilal ibn Rabah - the muezzin of Muhammad
 Hamīdah - daughter of Muslim ibn Aqeel
 Maymūnah - daughter of Hasan ibn Ali
 Sakinah (Fatimah al-Kubra) bint Husayn - daughter of Husayn ibn Ali (not to be confused with Ruqayyah who was the youngest)
 Asma bint Umais - wife of Ja'far ibn Abi Talib and Ali
 Abdullah ibn Ali ibn Husayn - son of Ali ibn Husayn Zayn al-Abidin

Other tombs for the family of imams

There are many tombs of the various descendants of the Imams (often called Imamzadeh). Some of them include:

 Great Mosque of Kufa in Kufa, Iraq - contains the tombs of Muslim ibn Aqeel, Khadijah bint Ali, Hani ibn Urwa, and Mukhtar al-Thaqafi. The mosque also contains many important sites relating to the prophets and Ali, including the place where he was fatally struck on the head while in Sujud
 Mount Uhud near Medina, Saudi Arabia - bears the grave of Hamza ibn Abdul-Muttalib the uncle of Muhammad, along with the graves of all the other Muslims who fell at the Battle of Uhud.
 The tomb of Zayd ibn Ali in Kufa, Iraq
 Muhammad ibn Muhammad ibn Zayd - a descendant of Ali ibn Husayn Zayn al-Abidin (grandson of Zayd ibn Ali) in Mashhad, Iran.
 Awlād Muslim Mosque in Musayyib, Iraq - entombs the remains of the sons of Muslim ibn Aqeel.

Tombs of Biblical prophets 
 Nabi Habeel Mosque in Syria - contains the grave of Abel (Arabic: Habeel ), son of Adam and Eve as believed by many Muslims

 Tomb of Daniel Daniel (Daniyal) who is considered to have been an Islamic prophet.
 Cave of the Patriarchs in Hebron, West Bank, Palestinian territories - contains the graves of the Prophet Abraham and some of his family
 Al-Nabi Yusha' in Upper Galilee, Israel - Tomb of prophet Joshua
 Great Mosque of Aleppo in Aleppo, Syria - entombs the remains of Zechariah, father of John the Baptist.
 Several tombs of prophets all over Iraq, Iran, Syria, Jordan, Israel, Palestine, and Saudi Arabia

Other places associated with Muhammad 
 Quba Mosque found just outside Medina, Saudi Arabia, was the first mosque ever built by Muhammad. Its first stones were positioned by Muhammad on his emigration from the city of Mecca to Medina and was subsequently completed by his companions. Muhammad then waited for Ali to arrive before he entered the city of Medina.

 Masjid al-Qiblatayn in Medina, Saudi Arabia - the mosque where the direction of prayer (qibla) was changed from Jerusalem to Mecca.

 Cave of Hira located on the mountain Jabal al-Nour in Saudi Arabia - the place where the first verses of the Quran were revealed to Muhammad

Tomb of modern holy figures in Shi'ite Islam 

Tomb of Hassan Modarres, built in 1937 in Kashmar, Iran
Mausoleum of Imam Khomeini, built in 1992 at Tehran, Iran.

See also
 Mukhtar al-Thaqafi
 Bayt al-Ahzan
 Holiest sites in Islam
 Ziyarat

References

Further reading
 Aghaie, Kamran Scot (2004). The Martyrs of Karbala: Shi'i Symbols and Rituals in Modern Iran. University of Washington Press.

External links 
 
 

Islamic pilgrimages